Nadhem Abdullah was an 18-year-old unarmed Iraqi civilian who was allegedly assaulted and murdered by soldiers from the United Kingdom Parachute Regiment during the Occupation of Iraq in May 2003.

Charges
Seven UK soldiers were charged and faced a court martial in Colchester, Essex. They all denied the charges, and were cleared by the judge on grounds of insufficient evidence. It is claimed that witnesses were bribed to lie in court by the family of Nadhem Abdullah, who were seeking a large compensation settlement from the British Army. However, despite comments that the case should have never been brought to court, Defence Minister Adam Ingram told the House of Commons that "no soldier is above the law."

References

2003 deaths

1980s births
Victims of human rights abuses
Iraqi murder victims
Iraqi torture victims